Jason Patrick Schuler (born February 24, 1972) is an American former stock car racing driver. He competed in the NASCAR Busch Series from 2000 to 2004. He is currently building cars for JJ Fabrication, Inc. (formerly Pathfinder Chassis), the company he owns and operates along with Joe Wood in Sun Prairie, Wisconsin.

Racing career
Schuler made his first starts in the Busch Series in 2000 when fellow Cambridge native and childhood friend Matt Kenseth, a full-time Cup Series driver, offered him a ride for twelve races in the No. 17 Visine Chevy for Reiser Enterprises that Kenseth was driving part-time. His best finish on the year was 14th at both Gateway (where he led two laps) and at New Hampshire. Schuler struggled, only earning four top-20 finishes, leading to his release at the end of the season in favor of Clay Rogers.

Schuler only made two starts in 2001, both for Buckshot Racing. Schuler finished 41st at Gateway and 35th at Pikes Peak in the No. 04, a second part-time car for the team.

Schuler only ran five times in 2002, all for the Havill-Spoerl Racing team. However, the team did not finish any of the starts, and Schuler's best finish was a pair of 36ths.

Schuler made the most races of his career in 2003, when Havill-Spoerl went full-time and Schuler made twenty-seven starts. His best run (and career finish) came at Nashville, where he finished 13th. In addition, Schuler added on two more top-twenties at Talladega and Gateway. At Pikes Peak, Schuler led eleven laps under caution before falling out in 28th. Schuler finished 28th in points, the highest he has ever ranked in NASCAR.

Schuler began 2004 by making six starts for Davis Motorsports in the No. 10 Chevy. Schuler finished four of those starts and had a best finish of 27th at North Carolina Speedway. He also made a start for Allen Racing at the Milwaukee Mile, where he finished 42nd.

After being without a ride for the 2005 season, Schuler returned to Wisconsin to drive late models and bought Pathfinder Chassis / JJ Motorsports Racing in 2005 along with Jon Wood based on Kenseth's recommendation; they moved the race car manufacturing shop to Sun Prairie, Wisconsin. In 2010, he was crew chief for Ross Kenseth and Ty Majeski.

Motorsports career results

NASCAR
(key) (Bold – Pole position awarded by qualifying time. Italics – Pole position earned by points standings or practice time. * – Most laps led.)

Busch Series

References

External links
 
 Fan site (old)

1972 births
American Speed Association drivers
Living people
NASCAR drivers
People from Cambridge, Wisconsin
Racing drivers from Wisconsin